Nagold is a town in southwestern Germany, bordering the Northern Black Forest. It is located in the Landkreis (district) of Calw (Germany/Baden-Württemberg). Nagold is known for its ruined castle, Hohennagold Castle, and for its road viaduct. It takes its name from the river Nagold, which flows through the town.

Nagold has a beautiful city centre where half-timbered houses and modern architecture meet each other. The following small villages belong to the district of Nagold: Emmingen, Gündringen, Hochdorf, Iselshausen, Mindersbach, Pfrondorf, Schietingen and Vollmaringen.

History

 was probably settled as early as the early Stone Age: 2000 to 3000 BCE. With its fertile soil and mild climate in the low mountain ridge, the basin afforded ideal possibilities for settlement. Traces of early human occupation from the Hallstatt culture (700 to 450 BCE) have been found in the "Bächlen" area.
The Celts were in the Nagold basin by the 6th and 5th centuries BCE. They were responsible for naming the river Nagold, meaning "flowing stretch of water". A Celtic royal burial mound (locally called Krautbühl) and signs of numerous settlements and graves have been found on and around Schlossberg.

By the 1st century, the Romans had established two settlements in the basin. One of these settlements was unearthed in the 7th century during construction of Remigiuskirche. Stone walls from the remains were used in the Remigiuskirche foundation.

The Alamanni expelled the Romans from the Nagold Basin around 260. They emphasized settlement of the valley, and expanded their territory. Around 700, the Franks conquered the Alamanni. The Remigiuskirche was built during this time, and it is assumed the Franks established a court in the area. Nagold became the administrative center of the region which extended from Bondorf to Kniebis. Small towns and settlements began to spring up around Nagold.
Pfalzgraf Rudolf von Tübingen established Nagold as a city early in the 13th century in order to protect his holdings in the northern Black Forest. Through marriage in the year 1230, Nagold came under the control of the Grafen von Hohenberg, who sped up development of the city. By the end of the 13th century, Nagold was encircled with a  wall, complete with moat and gate towers. Around 1350, the Plague devastated the population.

Construction was begun on Marienkirche church in 1360. The church was razed in 1876–1877, but an original tower built in 1401 still stands on Turmstrasse street.

In 1363 the Hohenbergs were forced out of Nagold, and the Dukes Eberhard and Ulrich von Württemberg bought the city. Nagold then served as a court city (Amtstadt), and in 1806 was elevated to a high court city (Oberamtstadt), which lasted until being abolished in 1938.

In the 16th century, farmers' uprisings led to the departure of the local aristocracy. Austria, always looking to expand the Habsburg domain, quickly moved into the Nagold area. Herzog Ulrich reclaimed his lands in 1534, and embraced Protestantism.

During the Thirty Years' War (1618–1647), the Burg Hohennagold (castle) was destroyed.

Parts of Nagold were destroyed in devastating fires in 1825, 1850, 1887, and 1893. Marktstrasse is one of the few streets in Nagold to have escaped destruction in the fires. A large of portion of the architecture on this street dates to the 18th century, and includes the three-story Rathaus (1756–1758), the Stadtbrunnen (city fountain), the Schmidsche Apotheke with rich ornamentation, and numerous Fachwerk (timbered) houses from the 17th century. Other architectural treasures are scattered through the city. Among these are the Alte Schule (old school, 1706) and the Alte Vogtei with Celtic origins. The hotel "Alte Post" (1699) served as a stop on the old mail line between Stuttgart and Strasbourg. The Oberamtei (from 14th century) is located on Oberamteistrasse, and was the location of the high court (Oberamt) from 1812 until 1938.

As early as 1924, Nagold was a NSDAP (Nazi) base of support. According to voting statistics, 19.4% of the population voted NSDAP in May 1924. Comparatively, the NSDAP captured just 6.5% of the vote nationwide, and a mere 4.1% in Baden and Württemberg during the same election.

The Reunification of Germany in 1989 brought new hopes for the future of Germany and Nagold, but was quickly followed by the worst recession in post-war history. Home construction, attraction of industry, and improvement of infrastructure have been difficult problems for Nagold. A city policy of construction, combined with improvement of the old city center, are cornerstones of the city planning. In 1992, the city's open-air swimming pool was amended with an indoor pool, and in 1996 a new cultural center named "Kubus" was built in the city center.

Population development
Data source: Estimates, Census results, data from statistical offices.

Mayors and (since 1981) Lord Mayors

 1819–1828: Konrad Greiner
 1828–1848: Gottlieb Fuchsstatt
 1848–1888: Eduard Friedrich Engel
 1888–1913: Friedrich Brodbeck
 1913–1945: Hermann Maier
 1945–1946: Walter Wolf
 1946–1974: Eugen Breitling
 1974–1992: Joachim Bernhard Schultis, CDU
 1992–2008: Rainer Prewo, SPD
 since 2008: Jürgen Großmann, CDU

Notable people
Giovanni Atzeni (born 1985), Jockey
 Rolf Benz (born 1933), entrepreneur, founder of Rolf Benz AG (furniture) 
 Martin Brecht (born 1932), professor for church history in Münster
 Stefan Dörflinger (born 1949), motorcycle racing driver
 Johann Epp (born 1521), rector of the University of Tübingen
Johann Friedrich Groß (born 1732), professor of physics in Karlsruhe and Stuttgart
 Ulrich Grosse (born 1953), local traffic consultant
 Silke Maier-Witt (born 1950), former member of the RAF

References

External links
  
 Castle ruin Hohen Nagold Black Forest tourist information 
 Nagold: pictures Town
 Nagold: pictures Castle Hohennagold

 
Calw (district)